Constantin Zamfir (born 15 May 1951) is a Romanian former football midfielder.

International career
Constantin Zamfir played 11 games for Romania, including appearances at qualifying matches for Euro 1976 and the 1978 World Cup. He also played one game for Romania's Olympic team in a 5–1 victory in which he scored a goal against Netherlands at the 1976 Summer Olympics qualifiers.

Honours
Steaua București
Divizia A: 1975–76, 1977–78
Cupa României: 1975–76, 1978–79
Progresul București
Divizia B: 1979–80

Notes

References

External links

1951 births
Living people
Romanian footballers
Romania international footballers
Association football midfielders
Liga I players
Liga II players
FC Dacia Pitești players
FC Petrolul Ploiești players
FC Steaua București players
FC Progresul București players